Ralph Errington (21 September 1886 – 4 April 1958) was a British diver who competed in the 1908 Summer Olympics. In 1908 he was eliminated in the semi-finals of the 3 metre springboard competition after finishing fifth in his heat.

References

External links
 
 

1886 births
1958 deaths
British male divers
Olympic divers of Great Britain
Divers at the 1908 Summer Olympics